The Little Vagabond is a 1794 poem by William Blake in his collection Songs of Innocence and of Experience. His collection, Songs of Innocence, was originally published alone, in 1789. The scholar Robert Gleckner says that the poem is a form of transformation of the boy in the poem "The School Boy", from Songs of Innocence.

Summary and structure
In "William Blake and the Ten Commandments", critic Paul Kuntz summarizes the main theme of the poem: it gives us a view into the lives of those who get drunk on Sundays versus those who choose to attend church. The poem tells the opinion of the boy who believes that more people would choose to go to church if there were alcoholic beverages. This is because he sees how happy those in the alehouse are, therefore he believes church should have a similar atmosphere and people would be more willing to attend. Also, that it would not be sinful to make the church similar to the alcohol-serving establishment because God wants to see his children happy.

This poem has four stanzas of four lines each. It has an ABCC rhyme scheme in the first stanza, but an AABB rhyme scheme in the last three.

Poem

Plate
The top of this plate displays a larger man, possibly God, laying over and protecting a boy. The lower section shows a group of people of different sizes hugging, possibly parents and children, sitting around a fire. The two halves of "Songs of Innocence and Experience" differ in more ways than the writing alone. The imagery on the plates differ as well. The tree bark on the plate of this poem is created using vertical lines; this is different than the tree bark on plates from "Songs of Innocence" because the tree bark is drawn in horizontal strokes on them. The rays of light over the larger man were considered a remarkable section of the plate, as Blake did not often add halos or anything similar over the heads of those in his plates in the past.

Themes and analysis
The repression of children's points of view in terms of church and happiness are motivating factors in Blake's writing of "The Little Vagabond." Another motivating factor is how different people view God in different ways. There have been many different reactions to "The Little Vagabond," from a renowned scholar, Wickstead saying that it is, "the noblest conception of Blake's ever-recurring idea that forgiveness is the only power of salvation" to Gilham's view that "the vagabond's vision is too earthy." Scholar, Galia Benziman proposes that the child narrarating could be interpreted as both hypocritical and deceptive, considering his hateful view of the church. She also considers the fact that rather than speaking to the priest about his concerns, the child chooses to proclaim his opinions, making any changes to his local church impossible an important point to recognize.
 The unlikely comparison of alehouse and church confused a major contributor to Duke scholarly journals, Coleridge, who says,

Musical settings
The poem has been used in a musical format in multiple instances. There is a bibliography which lists all of these, Blake Set to Music: A Bibliography of Musical Settings of the Poems and Prose of William Blake

References

External links
A Comparison of the extent versions of "The Little Vagabond"  from the William Blake Archive

1794 poems
Songs of Innocence and of Experience